Petek is a surname. It means "Friday" in Slovene and Serbo-Croatian (Kajkavian). Notable people with this surname include:

Božo Petek, Slovenian author
Damjan Petek (born 1973), Slovenian judoka
Franci Petek (born 1971), Slovenian ski jumper and geographer
Hrvoje Petek (born 1958), Croatian-born American physicist

See also
 
 Patek (surname)

Serbo-Croatian-language surnames
Slovene-language surnames